Heemstede may refer to:

 Heemstede, a town in North Holland, the Netherlands
 Slot Heemstede, a castle in Heemstede
 Heemstede-Aerdenhout railway station
 Heemstede (Utrecht), a hamlet near Houten in the Netherlands
 Heemstede (Nieuw-Nederland), now Hempstead, New York